St. Andrew—St. Patrick was a provincial electoral district in Ontario, Canada, that returned Members of Provincial Parliament (MPPs) to the Legislative Assembly of Ontario at Queen's Park.

The riding was created before the 1967 election when the former electoral districts of St. Andrew and St. Patrick were merged. The riding was located in downtown Toronto between Yonge Street to Bathurst Street and included areas such as Spadina Avenue, Kensington Market, the Annex and the affluent neighbourhood of Forest Hill.

It was named after St. Andrew's and St. Patrick's wards, which had been historical names for two wards in the City of Toronto.

The riding was abolished for the 1999 provincial election. Portions of it were distributed among Trinity—Spadina, St. Paul's, Toronto Centre—Rosedale and Eglinton—Lawrence.

Members of Provincial Parliament

Election results

References

Notes

Citations

Former provincial electoral districts of Ontario
Provincial electoral districts of Toronto